The men's lightweight (60 kilograms) event at the 2002 Asian Games took place from 2 to 13 October 2002 at Masan Gymnasium, Masan, South Korea.

Schedule
All times are Korea Standard Time (UTC+09:00)

Results 
Legend
RSCH — Won by referee stop contest head blow
RSCO — Won by referee stop contest outclassed

Final

Top half

Bottom half

References

External links
Official website

60